HD 49674 b is an extrasolar planet located approximately 134 light-years away in the constellation of Auriga, orbiting the star HD 49674. This planet was discovered orbiting the star in 2002. The planet is a gas giant and orbits extremely close to its star, which takes only 4.95 days to revolve.

HD 49674 b, along with its parent star, was chosen as part of the 2019 NameExoWorlds campaign organised by the International Astronomical Union in which each country was assigned a star and planet to be named.  The HD 49674 system was assigned to Belgium.  The winning proposal named HD 49674 b Eburonia and the parent star Nervia, both after prominent Belgic tribes, the Eburones and Nervii respectively.

References

External links
 
 
 Sky Map

Auriga (constellation)
Exoplanets discovered in 2002
Exoplanets detected by radial velocity
Exoplanets with proper names